This article contains a list of British Formula Three champions. The championship has been in existence intermittently since 1951 and has some former champions who later made Formula One. The most notable among these are multiple Formula One world champions Ayrton Senna, Jackie Stewart, Nelson Piquet, Jim Clark, Emerson Fittipaldi and Mika Häkkinen. This list not include champions of the BRDC British Formula 3 Championship.

By season

By driver nationality

Multiple champions

References

British Formula 3 champions
British Formula Three Championship
British Formula Three